Daniela Knapp is an Austrian cinematographer.  Her film credits include Eine Insel namens Udo, Edeltraud und Theodor, The Poll Diaries and Emma's Bliss.

References

External links

Austrian cinematographers
Year of birth missing (living people)
Living people
Place of birth missing (living people)